Putnamville Presbyterian Church, also known as Putnamville Methodist Church, is a historic Presbyterian church on IN 243 in Putnamville, Putnam County, Indiana. It was built in 1834, and is a one-story, Greek Revival style brick church.  A vestibule was added in 1953, and educational rooms added in 1961.  The building was dedicated by the noted Presbyterian minister Henry Ward Beecher.  It was sold to a Methodist congregation in 1861.

It was listed on the National Register of Historic Places in 1984.

References

Presbyterian churches in Indiana
Churches on the National Register of Historic Places in Indiana
Greek Revival church buildings in Indiana
Churches completed in 1834
Buildings and structures in Putnam County, Indiana
National Register of Historic Places in Putnam County, Indiana